The Lac de la Galette (English: "De La Galette Lake") is a freshwater body of the town of La Tuque, in Haute-Mauricie, forming a bay on the south shore of Gouin Reservoir and west of the upper Saint-Maurice River, in the administrative region of Mauricie, in the province of Quebec, in Canada.

This lake is mainly located in the township of Delage, except for a bay on the east shore that receives the waters of the Leblanc River (Gouin Reservoir), which penetrates eastward into the township of Leblanc. Following the erection completed in 1948 of the Gouin dam, the "Lac de la Galette" became an extension of the Bouzanquet Bay which is an extension to the south of Gouin Reservoir.

Forestry is the main economic activity of the sector. Recreational tourism activities come second.

Some secondary forest roads are in use nearby for forestry and recreational tourism activities.

The surface of the "De La Galette Lake" is usually frozen from mid-November to the end of April, however, safe ice circulation is generally from early December to late March.

Geography

Toponymy 
The toponym "Lac de la Galette" was formalized on December 18, 1986, by the Commission de toponymie du Québec, when it was created.

Notes and references

See also 

Lakes of Mauricie
La Tuque, Quebec